is a passenger railway station in the city of Isumi, Chiba Prefecture, Japan, operated by the third-sector railway operator Isumi Railway.

Lines
Kazusa-Azuma Station is served by the Isumi Line, and lies 5.2 kilometers from the eastern terminus of the line at Ōhara.

Station layout
Kazusa-Azuma Station has dual opposed side platforms serving two tracks, with a three-sided rain shelter built onto each platform. The station is unattended.

Platforms

Adjacent stations

History
Kazusa-Azuma Station opened on April 1, 1930 as a station on the Japanese Government Railway (JGR) Kihara Line. After World War II, the JGR became the Japanese National Railways (JNR). The station has been unattended since 1954, when scheduled freight operations were also discontinued. With the division and privatization of the Japan National Railways on April 1, 1987, the station was acquired by the East Japan Railway Company. On March 24, 1988, the Kihara Line became the Isumi Railroad Isumi Line.

Passenger statistics
In fiscal 2018, the station was used by an average of 30 passengers daily.

Surrounding area
 The station is located in the central area of former Azuma Village
 Yamada Post Office
 
 Isumi Municipal Azuma Elementary School
 Genji Hotaru no Sato

See also
 List of railway stations in Japan

References

External links

  Isumi Railway Company home page 

Railway stations in Japan opened in 1930
Railway stations in Chiba Prefecture
Isumi Line
Isumi